Henry Anthony Politz (May 9, 1932 – May 25, 2002) was a United States circuit judge of the United States Court of Appeals for the Fifth Circuit.

Education and career

Born in Napoleonville, Louisiana, Politz served in the United States Air Force from 1951 to 1955. He received a Bachelor of Arts degree from Louisiana State University in 1958 and a Juris Doctor from Paul M. Hebert Law Center at Louisiana State University in 1959. He was in private practice in Shreveport, Louisiana from 1959 to 1979.

Federal judicial service

On May 3, 1979, Politz was nominated by President Jimmy Carter to a new seat on the United States Court of Appeals for the Fifth Circuit created by 92 Stat. 1629. He was confirmed by the United States Senate on July 12, 1979, and received his commission on July 13, 1979. He served as Chief Judge from 1992 to 1999, assuming senior status on August 10, 1999. Politz served in that capacity until his death, on May 25, 2002, in Shreveport.

References

Sources
 

1932 births
2002 deaths
Judges of the United States Court of Appeals for the Fifth Circuit
United States court of appeals judges appointed by Jimmy Carter
20th-century American judges
Louisiana State University alumni
Louisiana State University Law Center alumni
People from Napoleonville, Louisiana